The Sutton Coldfield transmitting station is a broadcasting and telecommunications facility located in Sutton Coldfield, Birmingham, England. In terms of population covered, it is the third most important transmitter in the UK, after Crystal Palace in London and Winter Hill near Bolton.

History

On 17 December 1949, it became the first television transmitter to broadcast outside London and the Home Counties, bringing BBC Television to viewers outside of the south-east of England for the first time. 

In 1949 the site housed Britain's first post-war Marconi-EMI band 1 405 line television transmitter. When it was taken out of service in 1981 it was the oldest working television transmitter in the world.

For most of 1965, it had a low-power BBC2 service; this was turned onto full power on 4 October 1965; the East Midlands had no BBC2 service until Waltham began transmissions on 31 August 1968.

A new mast was built around 1983 to replace the original structure, primarily to support new mixed-polarisation FM antennas.

A 788 ft (240.2m) temporary mast was erected alongside the original mast in the spring of 2009 so that work could proceed in raising the height of the original mast by 100 ft (31m) to a total height of 887.5 ft (270.5m). After four years in service and almost a year after the completion of digital switch over, the temporary mast was removed during August 2013.

All analogue TV transmissions ceased on 21 September 2011, as part of the digital switchover. This made it one of the oldest transmitters in the country to formally end analogue broadcasts.

Services

The coverage extends as far south as Chipping Norton in Oxfordshire and as far north as Stoke-on-Trent. However, there are many relay transmitters around the Midlands that extend coverage even further.

The transmitter broadcasts eight digital television multiplexes, as well as VHF or FM transmitters for the four BBC national stations; the BBC's local service BBC WM on FM and DAB; independent national station Classic FM and local commercial radio stations Free Radio Birmingham, Heart West Midlands, Greatest Hits West Midlands (previously Kerrang 105.2 until June 2013, Planet Rock until September 2015, and Absolute Radio until December 2018) and Smooth West Midlands.

When opened as a UHF TV transmitter Sutton Coldfield was a B grouping, but with the advent of Digital broadcasting one of the six muxes could not be fitted into the original B group due to co-channel considerations. Thus mux 6 was transmitted slightly out of band on UHF Channel 55, though this would still be receivable on most B group aerials as this graph makes clear. In July 2007 it was confirmed by Ofcom that Sutton Coldfield would return to an undisputed B group transmitter post-Digital Switchover, a process that was completed on 21 September 2011.

An MF transmitter for Radio Birmingham (now BBC WM) used to be installed at this site, but could only be operated at 5 kW instead of the planned 10 kW because of interference to video equipment on the site. It was eventually replaced with a transmitter at the nearby Langley Mill MF site owned by Arqiva. This transmitter is currently used for the BBC Asian Network.

The station is now owned by Arqiva.

Radio

Analogue (FM)

Digital (DAB)

Television

Digital

Before switchover

Analogue
Analogue television signals are no longer broadcast from Sutton Coldfield as of 21 September 2011.

Relays 
The transmitter is served by a set of 35 local relays, delivering signals to areas shaded from it by hills and the curve of the Earth. These are:

Digital switchover
Digital switchover took place at Sutton Coldfield in September 2011. In preparation for this, major engineering works took place at the station. This was accomplished through the use of a temporary  mast constructed to broadcast all the area's services so that the main mast could be worked on 'cold'.

As at other stations, the digital switchover took place in two stages:

In the first stage (7 September 2011):

 BBC Two analogue (Channel 40) closed down
 Low-power BBC multiplex (Mux 1) on channel 41 closed down
 Low-power SDN multiplex (Mux A) moved from channel 47 to channel 41 (until stage 2)
 ITV analogue moved from channel 43 to channel 40 (until stage 2)
 High-power multiplex BBC A started on channel 43

In the second stage (21 September 2011):

 BBC One analogue (Channel 46) closed down
 ITV analogue (Channel 40) closed down
 Channel 4 analogue (Channel 50) closed down
 Mux 1 (C41), Mux 2 (C44), Mux A (C47), Mux B (C51), Mux C (C52) and Mux D (C55) closed down
 All multiplexes increased in power to 200,000 watts (200 kW)
 New multiplexes came on air: SDN on C42, Arqiva A on C45, Arqiva B on C39, Digital 3&4 on C46 and BBC B on C40.

HD broadcasts were moved from the Lichfield transmitter to Sutton Coldfield on the BBC B multiplex (C40, 626.2 MHz). The Lichfield transmitter ceased the broadcast of all television services (Analogue Channel 5 and Digital BBC B (Mux HD)), with all six multiplexes being broadcast from Sutton Coldfield.

Further reading
 Pawley, Edward (1972), BBC Engineering 1922 - 1972, London, BBC. pp 355, 368-70. 
 Cooper, Ray (2006), Tales from a Cold Field.

See also
Lichfield transmitting station
List of masts
List of radio stations in the United Kingdom
List of tallest buildings and structures in Great Britain

References

External links
 The Transmission Gallery: photographs, coverage maps and information
 Info and pictures of Sutton Coldfield TV transmitter including historical power/frequency changes and present co-receivable transmitters
 Sutton Coldfield Transmitter at thebigtower.com

Mass media in Birmingham, West Midlands
Buildings and structures in Birmingham, West Midlands
Transmitter sites in England
Sutton Coldfield